Phú Hòa is a rural district (huyện) of Phú Yên province in the South Central Coastal region of Vietnam. As of 2003 the district had a population of 102,974. The district covers an area of 263 km². The district capital lies at Phú Hòa.

References

Districts of Phú Yên province